The 1989 Panasonic Cup was the 16th edition of the NSWRL Midweek Cup, a NSWRL-organised national club Rugby League tournament between the leading clubs and representative teams from the NSWRL, the BRL, the CRL and Papua New Guinea. This was the final season of the competition, which was replaced by the Tooheys Challenge Cup the following year.

A total of 19 teams from across Australia and Papua New Guinea played 18 matches in a straight knock-out format, with the matches being held midweek during the premiership season.

Qualified teams

Venues

Preliminary rounds

Qualifying round

Quarter finals

Semi finals

Final

Teams
Brisbane : 
1. Shane Duffy, 2. Michael Hancock, 3. Tony Currie, 4. Peter Jackson, 5. Joe Kilroy, 6. Wally Lewis (c), 7. Allan Langer, 13. Terry Matterson, 12. Gene Miles, 11. Brett Le Man, 10. Sam Backo, 9. Kerrod Walters, 8. Greg Dowling Reserve James Donnelly. Coach: Wayne Bennett.

Illawarra : 
1. Steve Hampson, 2. Rod Wishart, 3. Brett Rodwell, 4. Jeff Hardy, 5. Jason Moon, 6. Tony Smith, 7. Andy Gregory, 13. Ian Russell, 12. Les Morrisey, 11. Dean Hanson, 10. Michael Carberry, 9. Dean Schifilliti, 8. Chris Walsh (c) Reserves Cavill Heugh, Craig Keen, Michael Bolt, Trevor Kissell. Coach: Ron Hilditch.

The Broncos raced to a 16-0 lead and it seemed the Steelers' much more fancied opponents would run away with the game. But Illawarra hit back. Illawarra lost the match 22-20, however Brisbane scored a try off what appeared to be a forward pass. The large Illawarra contingent of the 16,968 strong crowd at Parramatta Stadium booed the Broncos after their win, with Brisbane captain Wally Lewis gaining their ire by gesturing back. Illawarra's performance inspired Australian folk singer John Williamson to write a song about the match.

Notes
 
 – advanced having scored the first try
+ – advanced on penalty countback

Awards

Player of the series
 Terry Matterson (Brisbane)

Golden Try
 Glenn Ryan (Manly-Warringah)

References

Sources
 https://web.archive.org/web/20070929092902/http://users.hunterlink.net.au/~maajjs/aus/nsw/sum/nsw1989.htm

1989
1989 in Australian rugby league